Pampachiri is a rural district in Andahuaylas Province in the Apurímac Region of southern Peru. It is also the name of a village in the district. The population of the district is about 2,400 with about 1,000 of those residents living in the village of the same name.

Before the Spanish conquest, it was populated by the Inca, Chanka and Wari peoples who have left numerous archeological sites in the area. There exist populations of pumas, condors and many other rare animals and plants.

It is an area of outstanding natural beauty. High in the puna area is Panqulla, a spectacular stone forest which is an unusual geological phenomenon of volcanic rocks in the shape of large smooth cones.

The main economic activities of the population are subsistence agriculture and cattle raising (lowlands) and alpaca and vicuña husbandry (highlands). Typical crops grown in Pampachiri include potatoes, corn, alfalfa, and tuna, the fruit of the cactus indigenous to the region. It is one of the poorest districts of Peru, with a typical family income of under US$1000 a year.

Geography 
Other mountains are listed below:

Ethnic groups 
The people in the district are mainly indigenous citizens of Quechua descent. Quechua is the language which the majority of the population (69.69%) learnt to speak in childhood, 29.91% of the residents started speaking using the Spanish language (2007 Peru Census).

Sources 

Districts of the Andahuaylas Province